Agim Kadillari (born 1953) is an Albanian painter.

Active since 1976 he has given exhibitions in Tirana, Cetinje (Montenegro), Assen (Netherlands), Haren (Germany) and Crete in Greece.

See also
 List of Albanian painters

References

External links
 Paintings

Albanian painters
1953 births
Living people